Helicia australasica, also named Austral oak or creek silky oak,  is a species of rainforest trees from the flowering plant family Proteaceae.

Its everyday name in the local northeast Queensland Dyirbal language was miyabur, though a more general word gurruŋun "oak tree" (also applied to Darlingia ferruginea and Cardwellia sublimis) was used in the taboo [Dyalŋuy] vocabulary.

They grow naturally through New Guinea and in Australia in central and northeastern Queensland, Cape York Peninsula and the Northern Territory, from about  altitude.

They are threatened by habitat loss.

References

australasica
Proteales of Australia
Flora of Papua New Guinea
Vulnerable flora of Australia
Flora of Queensland
Flora of the Northern Territory
Taxonomy articles created by Polbot
Taxa named by Ferdinand von Mueller